David Madzhar (born 9 December 1920) was a Bulgarian alpine skier. He competed in three events at the 1948 Winter Olympics.

References

External links
 

1920 births
Possibly living people
Bulgarian male alpine skiers
Olympic alpine skiers of Bulgaria
Alpine skiers at the 1948 Winter Olympics
Place of birth missing